Multan Sultans (Urdu,) is a Pakistani professional Twenty20 franchise cricket team representing the city of Multan in southern Pakistan in the Pakistan Super League (PSL). The team was founded in 2017 as an additional sixth team added to the PSL. The team plays its home matches at Multan Cricket Stadium.

After their debut season, Schön Properties who bought the team in 2017, failed to pay their annual fee, and their contract was terminated; in December 2018, a consortium formed by Alamgir Khan Tareen, the majority shareholder, and Ali Khan Tareen became the new owners of the team. In 2021, Alamgir Khan Tareen took over as the sole owner.

The team won its first PSL title in the 2021 season.

Franchise history
In April 2017, a few weeks after the conclusion of 2017 Pakistan Super League, PSL chairman Najam Sethi announced that there would be a sixth team in the third season. The Pakistan Cricket Board short-listed five regions as possibilities for the sixth team. In June 2017, the team was established with the franchise having been was bought by Schön Properties after winning a bid for an eight-year contract against 10 contesting bidders.

On 10 November 2018, the PCB announced that the franchise agreement had been terminated and all rights in respect to the franchise were returned to the board. The termination was due to the franchise failing to pay the annual fee required by the PCB. The PCB took responsibility of all player and coach contracts whilst a public tender process took place to sell the repackaged rights for the franchise. Alamgir Khan Tareen and Ali Khan Tareen of Multan Consortium, won the bid for the team. In 2021, Alamgir Khan Tareen bought the sole ownership rights.

2018 season 

In its debut season, the team was captained by Shoaib Malik. Tom Moody and Wasim Akram were appointed as head coach and director respectively with Haider Azhar as general manager of cricket operations and Nadeem Khan the team's manager.

The side won its first match, defeating defending champions Peshawar Zalmi by seven wickets but finished fifth in the league table, winning four matches and losing five with one no result. They did not make the playoffs.

2019 season 

Ahead of the 2019 season, Johan Botha, who had been assistant coach during the previous season, was appointed as head coach, replacing Moody, who withdrew from his role due to domestic commitments. Wasim Akram also left the team, joining Karachi Kings.

The Sultans started their season against Karachi Kings with a close defeat and went on to win only three matches, again finishing fifth and failing to make the playoffs. Captain Shoaib Malik was the leading run scorer with 266 runs, while Shahid Afridi took 10 wickets to be the team's leading wicket taker for the season.

2020 season

Ahead of the 2020 season, Shan Masood was named team captain and Andy Flower became the team's head coach. The side reached the playoff stage of the competition for the first time after finishing top of the group. They lost both of their playoff matches and did not reach the competition final finishing third overall.

2021 season

In 2021, Multan finished second in the group stage and went on to win the PSL final for the first time. After winning the first qualifier match against Islamabad United, who had finished top of the group stage, Multan progressed straight to the final where they beat Peshawar Zalmi by 47 runs and won their first title.

Team identity
The team's logo and kit was revealed in September 2017. The team's anthem Hum Hain Multan kay Sultans for the 2018 season was sung by Waqar Ehsin. Pakistan film stars Momal Sheikh, Javed Sheikh, Ahsan Khan, Neelam Munir and actress Sadia Khan were the team's star ambassadors for the 2018 season.

Current squad

Administration and coaching staff

Captains

Source: ESPNcricinfo. Last updated: 26 February 2022

Result summary

Overall result in PSL

Tie+W and Tie+L indicates matches tied and then won or lost in a tiebreaker such as a bowlout or one-over-eliminator ("Super Over")
The result percentage excludes no results and counts ties (irrespective of a tiebreaker) as half a win
Source: ESPNcricinfo, Last updated: 26 February 2022.

Head-to-head record

Source: ESPNcricinfo, Last updated: 18 February 2022.

References

External links

 
2017 establishments in Pakistan
Sport in Multan
Cricket clubs established in 2017
Sports clubs in Pakistan
Cricket in Multan